Paul Duerden (born October 22, 1974 in London, Ontario) is a volleyball player from Canada, who competed for the Canadian Men's Senior National Team from 1993 to 2008.

He won the 2008–09 GM Capital Challenge Cup playing with Arkas Spor Izmir and was awarded "Most Valuable Player".

Clubs
  Arkas Spor Izmir (2008–2010)

Awards

Individuals
 2008–09 GM Capital Challenge Cup "Most Valuable Player"

References

External links
 Official Site
 Profile
 Canada Olympic Committee Bio

1974 births
Living people
Arkas Spor volleyball players
Canadian expatriate sportspeople in Belgium
Canadian expatriate sportspeople in France
Canadian expatriate sportspeople in Germany
Canadian expatriate sportspeople in Italy
Canadian expatriate sportspeople in Turkey
Canadian men's volleyball players
Canadian people of German descent
Sportspeople from London, Ontario
Volleyball people from Ontario
Volleyball players at the 1999 Pan American Games
Volleyball players at the 2007 Pan American Games
Pan American Games bronze medalists for Canada
Pan American Games medalists in volleyball
Medalists at the 1999 Pan American Games